Negro Hill is a mountain located in the Catskill Mountains of New York northeast of Roxbury. Roundtop is located south-southwest, Clay Hill is located east and Ferris Hill is located northwest of Negro Hill.

References

Mountains of Delaware County, New York
Mountains of New York (state)